C/1999 J6 (SOHO) is a small comet, notable for being among those that made a close approach to the Earth. It was first observed by the space-based Solar and Heliospheric Observatory (SOHO) on 10 May 1995.

The most notable Earth approach was on June 12, 1999 when it passed between 357,000 km to 3.3 million km from Earth. The uncertainty is a result of the large number of observations at roughly the same time as there were around 50 observations on 2010-04-19. The discovery was made on March 20, 2000, during a review of previously captured images.  

It next came to perihelion in November 2004, when it was known as "C/2004 V9",  and then on April 19, 2010 when it was known as "C/2010 H3". On August 15, 2015 it should have been 0.56 AU from Earth.

Notes

References 
 

Sungrazing comets